Patti S. Hart is the vice chairman of International Game Technology (IGT). She previously served as its CEO from April 2009 through April 2015, and has served on the company's board of directors since June 2006.

Career
Prior to joining IGT, Hart served as the chairman and chief executive officer of Pinnacle Systems Inc. from 2004 to 2005, Excite@Home Inc. from 2001 to 2002, and of Telocity Inc. from 1999 to 2001. Hart also held various management positions at the Sprint Corporation, including president and COO of Sprint's Long Distance Division. Hart has served on numerous public company boards, including Yahoo! Inc. and Korn/Ferry International Inc., and currently serves on the board of the American Gaming Association. Hart earned a Bachelor of Science degree in business administration with an emphasis in marketing and economics from Illinois State University.

She frequently contributes to gambling publications, is a founding member of the Global Gaming Women initiative, the 2013 Las Vegas Chair of Go Red for Women, and a 2012 inductee to the Illinois State University Hall of Fame.

Hart was a member of the board of directors at Yahoo! and led the CEO search resulting in the hiring of Scott Thompson who falsified his educational credentials. A hiring scandal ensued at Yahoo! and Hart was accused of padding her own resume, submitted with Yahoo's regulatory filings and listing a degree in marketing and economics. Her degree was actually in Business Administration with specialties in marketing and economics.

After a thorough review, the IGT board of directors found no material inconsistencies in Patti Hart's academic credentials. The board unanimously chose to stand behind Hart as CEO and support her leadership and the direction she set for the company.

References

Directors of Yahoo!
American technology chief executives
American corporate directors
Women corporate directors
Corel
American women chief executives
Illinois State University alumni
Living people
American chief operating officers
Year of birth missing (living people)
21st-century American women